Younger Brothers may refer to:
James-Younger Gang
James & Michael Younger, also known as the Younger Brothers, American country music group
 The Younger Brothers, 1949 Western film directed by Edwin L. Marin, and starring Wayne Morris and Janis Paige.

See also